Varahaperumal Temple is a Hindu temple dedicated to Varaha (the boar avatar of the god Vishnu) at Kumbakonam in Thanjavur district, Tamil Nadu, India.

Presiding deity
The moolavar presiding deity, is found in his manifestation as Varahaperumal (Varaha). His consort is known as Bhoomidevi.

Legend
Once a demon took the earth to the underground. Devas prayed to Vishnu to save the world. Vishnu fought with the demon in the form of Varaha - a boar and brought out the world from underground.

Specialty
Five Vishnu temples are connected with Mahamaham festival which happens once in 12 years in Kumbakonam, the others being:
Sarangapani Temple, 
Chakrapani Temple, 
Ramaswamy Temple, 
Rajagopalaswamy Temple

Garudasevai
Garudasevai is one of the main festivals of the temple.

Mahasamprokshanam
The Mahasamprokshanam also known as Kumbabishegam of the temple was held on 26 October 2015.

See also
 Mahamaham
 Mahamaham tank, Kumbakonam
 Hindu temples of Kumbakonam

References

Mahasamprokshanam 26 October 2015

Hindu temples in Kumbakonam
Varaha temples